The Academy of Richmond County is a high school located in Augusta, Georgia, United States. Known previously as Richmond County Military Academy, it is commonly known as Richmond Academy or ARC.

Chartered in 1783, it is listed as the sixth oldest existing public high school in the United States, and the oldest existing public high school in the Southern United States.

Richmond Academy is located at the edge of the Summerville historic district of Augusta.

History

Initially an all-male private school, as were most of the high schools in the 1700s, after the Civil War it was adapted as a military school. During the last half of the 20th century, Richmond Academy transitioned into a co-educational, traditional public high school. It has maintained a strong military Junior Reserve Officer Training Corps that is available, but not mandatory, for participation by students. Both the 1857, and the present 1926, Richmond Academy buildings are listed on the National Register of Historic Places.

President George Washington delivered the commencement address at the graduation ceremonies at ARC in 1791.

In 1926, the academy moved to its present-day building on Walton Way. Principal Major George Butler described the school in 1927 as "second to none in the South in terms of facility." The 1926 building was designed in Gothic-style architecture.

Up until the 1950s, ARC was for white males only. The 1951–1957 Richmond Academy boys' baseball team was ranked as one of the top 10 Georgia state sports dynasties. It has teams in many sports.

During the 1950s the school became coeducational, admitting female students. In 1964, the school began to admit minorities and became desegregated.

Contemporary Richmond Academy

Academics
The Academy of Richmond County has 1,178 students in grades 9 through 12, with a student to faculty ratio of 16:1.
It offers numerous Advanced Placement courses, has a GATE (gifted and talented education) program, and an International Baccalaureate Programme course of study that was added to the school in July 2003. It is for its highly motivated, college preparatory students. ARC is one of three schools in the Central Savannah River Area that offers an IB program.

The Mathematics Team won the 2005 National Society of Black Engineers Try-Math-A-Thon, which was held in Boston.

Athletics
The school mascot is a Musketeer, and the school colors are purple and gold. The original school mascot was a bearcat.

The 1957 Varsity Baseball Team was named National Champions by MaxPreps.com.  The 1952 and 1953 squads were honorable mentions.

Notable alumni

See also

History of Augusta, Georgia
List of people from Augusta, Georgia

References

External links
Academy of Richmond County official website
National Park Service "Discover Our Shared Heritage" travel itinerary

1783 establishments in Georgia (U.S. state)
Educational institutions established in 1783
National Register of Historic Places in Augusta, Georgia
High schools in Richmond County, Georgia
Public high schools in Georgia (U.S. state)
School buildings on the National Register of Historic Places in Georgia (U.S. state)